There are several Great South Roads:
 Great South Road (New South Wales), a historical road in Australia leading from Sydney to Goulburn.
 Great South Road, New Zealand, a road between Auckland and Wellington.